Benjamin William Grant (born 18 May 1998 in Australia) is an Australian rugby union player who plays for the  in Global Rapid Rugby and the Super Rugby AU competition and the San Diego Legion in Major League Rugby (MLR). His original playing position is lock. He was named in the Force squad for the Global Rapid Rugby competition in 2020.

Early life 
He moved to Adelaide at the age of one with his mother (Alison Grant) and father (Travis Grant). His brother (William Grant) was born in 2001 followed by his youngest brother (Jay Grant) born in 2003. He later moved back to Queensland living in Gold Coast were he found his passion for rugby union. He attended All Saints Anglican School throughout his upbringing.

Reference list

External links
Rugby.com.au profile
itsrugby.co.uk profile

1998 births
Australian rugby union players
Living people
Rugby union locks
Perth Spirit players
Western Force players
Sportspeople from the Gold Coast, Queensland
Queensland Reds players
San Diego Legion players
Rugby union players from Queensland